Rudolf Strejček (born 30 November 1950) is a Czech weightlifter. He competed at the 1972 Summer Olympics, the 1976 Summer Olympics and the 1980 Summer Olympics.

References

External links
 

1950 births
Living people
Czech male weightlifters
Olympic weightlifters of Czechoslovakia
Weightlifters at the 1972 Summer Olympics
Weightlifters at the 1976 Summer Olympics
Weightlifters at the 1980 Summer Olympics
People from Příbram District
Sportspeople from the Central Bohemian Region